The Bishop and Clerk Islets are a  group of islets, lying  south of Macquarie Island in the southwestern Pacific Ocean. They are, with Macquarie Island, part of  the Australian state of Tasmania. The group consists of Bishop Islet, 24 smaller islets, and various rocks and reefs.

The Bishop and Clerk Islets are part of the Australian state of Tasmania. They are the southernmost terrestrial point of both Australia (excluding the Australian Antarctic Territory) and Tasmania. The islets are within the Macquarie Island Nature Reserve, managed by the Tasmanian Parks and Wildlife Service and along with Macquarie Island and the Judge and Clerk Islets, were inscribed in 1997 on the UNESCO World Heritage Area, and form a Special Management Area within the nature reserve. They are very infrequently visited and are free of introduced animals and plants.

History
Three known landings have been made on the islets, all by ship-assisted helicopter. The first, in 1965, was on a rock  from Bishop Isle. The following two, in 1976 and 1993, were on Bishop Islet itself.

Ecology
Macquarie shags have been recorded nesting at the Bishop and Clerk Islets. A colony of black-browed albatrosses was discovered in 1965.

The only vascular plant recorded on Bishop Islet is Colobanthus muscoides, while two varieties of lichens have also been noted.

See also

 Judge and Clerk Islets
 List of Antarctic and sub-Antarctic islands
 List of islands of Tasmania

References

Protected areas of Tasmania
Macquarie Island
Islands of Tasmania
Islands of the Pacific Ocean
Macquarie Island